"Make Me Smile" is a song written by James Pankow for the rock band Chicago with the band's guitarist, Terry Kath, on lead vocals. Part 1 of Pankow's 7-part "Ballet for a Girl in Buchannon" song cycle/suite, it was recorded for their second album, Chicago (often called Chicago II), which was released in 1970.  The song "Now More Than Ever", a separate track from the same song suite, serves as a reprise of the song and appears edited together with it on many later versions, including a single edit, on several greatest hits collections, and in many live performances.

Background
A radio-friendly edit of "Make Me Smile" was released as a single in March 1970, becoming the band's first Top 10 record, peaking at number nine on the U.S. Billboard Hot 100 chart. Pulled from the first movement of the "Ballet for a Girl in Buchannon" suite, several changes were made in order to make the song more suitable for radio. This included a modified introduction and abbreviated guitar solo. Finally, the track "Now More Than Ever" was appended on the end to make a complete, 3-verse song.  When Chicago released their compilation album The Very Best of Chicago: Only the Beginning in 2002, they featured a new edit of the song, with the "Make Me Smile" and "Now More Than Ever" parts segued together again, but without the numerous cuts—the full intro and the guitar solo of the former part, and the full outro of the latter part, were thus included.

"Make Me Smile" was the group's breakthrough hit,  in that its success triggered renewed interest in the group's two prior releases from 1969 which had previously failed to reach the U.S. Top 40. "Questions 67 and 68" had reached #71 that year, but on re-release in 1971 reached #24.  And "Beginnings" had failed to chart in 1969, but on re-release in 1971 reached number seven on the Pop chart and #1 on the Easy Listening chart.

Since the death of Terry Kath in 1978, the vocals for live performances of "Make Me Smile" were handled by Bill Champlin, who joined the band for the recording of Chicago 16, until he departed the group in August 2009. On shows that Champlin did not attend, Robert Lamm sang the lead vocal again in 2022 to onwards. Champlin's replacement Lou Pardini took over the singing of "Make Me Smile" until his departure in 2022, when keyboardist Loren Gold sang the song since 2022 alongside his substitute Rob Arthur.

Chart performance

Weekly charts

Year-end charts

Personnel
 Terry Kath - lead vocals, fuzzed electric guitar
 Robert Lamm - piano, backing vocals
 Peter Cetera - bass, backing vocals
 Danny Seraphine - drums, tambourine, maracas
 Jimmy Pankow - trombone
 Lee Loughnane - trumpet
 Walt Parazaider - tenor saxophone

In popular culture
"Make Me Smile" was made available for download on October 23, 2012 for Rock Band 3 Basic and PRO mode for use with real guitar/bass guitar, and MIDI-compatible electronic drum kits/keyboards, but as its new edit from The Very Best of Chicago: Only the Beginning.

References

External links
 

1970 singles
Chicago (band) songs
Songs written by James Pankow
Song recordings produced by James William Guercio
Columbia Records singles